Cucumber is a census-designated place (CDP) in McDowell County, West Virginia, United States. Its population was 74 at the 2020 census. The community is centered on mining. Named either for nearby Cucumber Creek or for the cucumber trees in the area, it is the only community in the United States with this name. Its post office was still active as of October 2011 (see image).

Mine collapse
On January 13, 2007, a tunnel collapse at a Brooks Run Mining Company coal mine in town killed two miners. Between 2005 and 2008, the Brooks Mining Company extracted 2,093,165 tons of coal.

Demographics

See also

 List of census-designated places in West Virginia

References

External links

Census-designated places in McDowell County, West Virginia
Census-designated places in West Virginia
Mining communities in West Virginia
Coal towns in West Virginia